The Museum of Jordanian Heritage is part of the Faculty of Archeology and Anthropology at Yarmouk University. The museum also shows the stages of civilization development that Jordan witnessed during successive periods of time, focusing on cultural relations, contacts, population distribution, economic life, and various aspects of civilization.

History 
The museum was opened in 1988 with support from the German government. The Department of Antiquities of Jordan provided the museum with several artifacts, and Widad Qa'war gave the museum ethnographic costumes. In 2013, some antiquities were stolen from the museum.

Collections 
The museum is divided into four rooms, the first room is dedicated to exhibiting objects of prehistoric times, in this room shows the development of early civilizations and plant collection systems. The third room is dedicated to exhibiting artifacts from both the Roman and Byzantine periods, in this room are artifacts found in a cemetery near Queen Alia International Airport. The fourth room is dedicated to displaying artifacts dating from the early Islamic period from the period of the first caliphate, with a representation of the settlements at the end of the nineteenth century AD, this room also covers the Ayyubid, Mamluk and Ottoman periods. The museum has a hall dedicated to Coinage, among them coins made of gold, bronze and copper dating from the Lydian, Nabataean, Roman Byzantine, Hellenistic and Islamic periods. The museum contains silver coins that were used during the reign of Sharif Hussein bin Ali. It also contains a bronze medal with the face of Abdullah bin Al-Hussein. Among the museum's collections are tools of King Faisal I. The museum also contains ceramics, badges of recognition and plates. The museum contains statuettes found at ʿAin Ghazal.

Gallery

References 

Museums in Jordan
Yarmouk University
Archaeological museums in Jordan
Museums established in 1988
1988 establishments in Jordan
Irbid